Caspar Anton Lucas Baaden (July 26, 1833 in Bonn, Prussia – July 1918) was an American politician from New York.

Life
He came from Prussia to the United States and was naturalized in 1867.

He was a flour-dealer on Broome Street in New York City.

He was a member of the New York State Senate (6th D.) in 1876 and 1877.

He died in July 1918, and was buried at the Green-Wood Cemetery in Brooklyn.

References

Sources
 Naturalization Records
 REPUBLICAN CONVENTIONS in NYT on October 20, 1875
 Journal of the Senate (99th Session) (pg. 3)

External links

1833 births
1918 deaths
Burials at Green-Wood Cemetery
Republican Party New York (state) state senators
Politicians from New York City
Prussian emigrants to the United States